Mark Alexander McKenzie (born February 25, 1999) is an American professional soccer player who plays as center-back for Belgian Pro League club Genk and the United States national team.

Youth and college soccer
Growing up in Bear, Delaware, McKenzie began playing club soccer for Delaware Rush and Wilmington Rangers before being brought into the Philadelphia Union Academy. He is of Jamaican descent through his father. McKenzie played college soccer at Wake Forest University starting in 2017, joining his academy teammates Matthew Real and Joseph DeZart. McKenzie made his first start for the Deacons as a freshman against Clemson University.
He registered 16 appearances and 5 starts for the Deacons.

Professional career

Bethlehem Steel
McKenzie's performance in the academy ranks earned him call-ups to the Bethlehem Steel FC roster, the Union's USL team. He made his professional debut against New York Red Bulls II in June 2016. Over two seasons, McKenzie made 8 appearances for the Steel as an amateur player.

Philadelphia Union
On January 18, 2018, McKenzie signed a homegrown player contract with Major League Soccer side Philadelphia Union.
He made 20 appearances his rookie season with the Union, mostly starting alongside fellow homegrown centerback, Auston Trusty. McKenzie's appearances and performance on the backline earned him a nomination for the 2018 MLS Rookie of the Year Award.

After losing his starting spot in the first team during the first half of the 2019 season, he reentered the line-up establishing himself as an initiator of attacks as a left-sided centerback. He retained his starting role through the 2020 season, earning accolades along the way. By mid-season, he made the Best XI for the MLS is Back Tournament. McKenzie's first professional goal for the Union was a long-range equalizer against D.C. United in October 2020. McKenzie finished the season with two goals and three assists from 22 matches, contributing to the Union's first trophy in the 2020 Supporters' Shield. His performances named him to the MLS Best XI and nominated for the 2020 Defender of the Year (finishing second in the voting).

Genk 
On January 7, 2021, McKenzie joined Belgian First Division A side Genk, signing a four-and-a-half year deal. McKenzie made his debut for Genk on January 24, starting in a 2–3 loss against Club Brugge. He finished his first season making 16 appearances in all competitions and helped Genk win the Belgian Cup.

International career
McKenzie spent time in the US development ranks, being called into under-15 and under-16 camps. In 2017, McKenzie was called into the United States under-18s for the Slovakia Cup. He made 7 appearances for the team in 2017. His performances earned him 2016–17 Conference Best XI honors for the US Development Academy Eastern Conference under-18s.

McKenzie received a call-up to the United States under-20 squad to compete in the 2018 CONCACAF U-20 Championship. McKenzie scored 3 goals during the qualifying group stages and captained the team in a 7–0 victory against Suriname. Mark was named Captain of the under-20 squad. On December 20, 2018, McKenzie received his first senior call up for a friendly against Panama.

On February 1, 2020, McKenzie earned his first senior cap for the national team as a substitute in a friendly match against Costa Rica.

McKenzie earned his World Cup qualifying debut in September 2021, starting in a 1–4 comeback win at Honduras.

Career statistics

Club

International

Honors
Philadelphia Union
Supporters' Shield: 2020

Genk
Belgian Cup: 2020–21

United States U20
CONCACAF U-20 Championship: 2018

United States
CONCACAF Nations League: 2019–20

Individual
CONCACAF Under-20 Championship Best XI: 2018
MLS is Back Tournament Best XI: 2020
MLS Best XI: 2020

References

External links
 
 Philadelphia Union Profile
 Wake Forest Profile

1999 births
Living people
African-American soccer players
American soccer players
American sportspeople of Jamaican descent
Association football defenders
Homegrown Players (MLS)
Philadelphia Union II players
Major League Soccer players
Belgian Pro League players
People from Bear, Delaware
Philadelphia Union players
K.R.C. Genk players
Soccer players from Delaware
Sportspeople from the Delaware Valley
United States men's under-20 international soccer players
USL Championship players
United States men's international soccer players
American expatriate soccer players
Expatriate footballers in Belgium
21st-century African-American sportspeople
American podcasters
American expatriate sportspeople in Belgium
Wake Forest Demon Deacons men's soccer players